The Pan American Youth Beach Handball Championship was the official competition for men's and women's youth national beach handball teams of America. In addition to crowning the Pan American champions, the tournament also served as a qualifying tournament for the IHF Youth Beach Handball World Championship. Only two were held as in 2018, the PATHF disbanded and the tournaments were replaced with the North America & the Caribbean and South & Central American championships.

Men

Summary

Medal table

Participating nations

Women

Summary

Medal table

Participating nations

References

Pan-American Team Handball Federation competitions
Beach handball competitions
Recurring sporting events established in 2017
Recurring sporting events disestablished in 2018